Kitryum is a rural locality (a village) in Shagirtskoye Rural Settlement, Kuyedinsky District, Perm Krai, Russia. The population was 156 as of 2010. There are 3 streets.

Geography 
Kitryum is located 46 km west of Kuyeda (the district's administrative centre) by road. Stepanovka is the nearest rural locality.

References 

Rural localities in Kuyedinsky District